Sophia Koggouli (born 26 July 1991) is a Greek footballer who plays as a forward for Tavagnacco of the Italian Serie B and the Greece national team.

Career
Koggouli finished as the Greek Division A top scorer for seven consecutive years (from 2009 to 2016), scoring a total of 183 goals during that time while playing for Elpides Karditsas, before transferring to Italian team AGSM Verona in June 2016. In July 2018, Koggouli moved to fellow Serie A side Fiorentina. A year later, Koggouli joined her third Italian team, Tavagnacco.

References

External links
 

1991 births
Living people
Women's association football forwards
Greek women's footballers
Greece women's international footballers
Elpides Karditsas players
Serie A (women's football) players
A.S.D. AGSM Verona F.C. players
Fiorentina Women's F.C. players
Footballers from Larissa
Greek expatriate women's footballers
Greek expatriate sportspeople in Italy
Expatriate women's footballers in Italy